Ohio, Nova Scotia may refer to one of the following communities in Canada:

Ohio, Antigonish County, in Antigonish County
Ohio, Digby, Nova Scotia, in Digby County
Ohio, Shelburne, Nova Scotia, in the District of Shelbourne
Ohio, Yarmouth, Nova Scotia, in Yarmouth County